Iliwerung or Illiwerung is a complex volcano forming a prominent south-facing peninsula on Lembata Island in southern Indonesia. It contains north-south and northwest-southeast trending lines of craters and lava domes, with the summit dome having formed by a VEI-3 eruption in 1870. 

Iliwerung has erupted at least 13 times since 1870, with eruptions having occurred in 1910, 1928, 1948, 1949, 1950, 1951, 1952, 1973-1974, 1976, 1983, 1993, 1999, 2013 and 2021. Eruptions since 1973 have been confined to Hobal, a submarine parasitic vent on Iliwerung's lower east-southeastern flank.

Iliwerung lies on the southern rim of the Lerek caldera. In 1983, a tsunami resulting from a submarine eruption caused few deaths.

See also
List of volcanoes in Indonesia

References

Mountains of Indonesia
Volcanoes of the Lesser Sunda Islands
Active volcanoes of Indonesia
Complex volcanoes
VEI-3 volcanoes